, also read as Kawata, is a common Japanese surname. Notable people with the surname include:

Atsuko Kawada (born 1965), Japanese actress
Jun Kawada, poet
Junko Kawada (born 1974), J-pop singer
, Japanese footballer
Mami Kawada, J-pop singer
Ryuhei Kawada (born 1976), Haemophiliac and member of the House of Councillors
Shinji Kawada (born 1971), Japanese voice actor
Toshiaki Kawada (born 1963), Japanese professional wrestler
Kazuhiro Kawata (born 1982), Japanese football player
Satoshi Kawata (born 1951), Japanese nanotechnologist
Taeko Kawata (born 1965), Japanese voice actress
Kikuji Kawada (born 1933), Japanese photographer
, Japanese archer
Yukiyosi Kawada, Japanese mathematician

Fictional characters
Noriko Kawada, a character in Digimon Adventure
Shogo Kawada, a character in Battle Royale

See also
Kawada, Gunma, Japan

Japanese-language surnames